Ryan Hayden (born March 13, 1971) is an American retired hurdler.  He represented the USA at the 1995 World Championships.

References

1971 births
Living people
American male hurdlers
Universiade medalists in athletics (track and field)
Place of birth missing (living people)
Universiade gold medalists for the United States
Medalists at the 1995 Summer Universiade

Track and field athletes from Indiana